John Chester is an Emmy award-winning filmmaker and television director. His recent short films for OWN's Super Soul Sunday (including Saving Emma, Worry for Maggie and The Orphan) have won five Emmy Awards, for outstanding directing, writing, and cinematography, among others. Chester's first primetime television docu-series aired on A&E, Random 1, which he directed and starred in in 2006. The series inspired his feature documentary Lost in Woonsocket which premiered at SXSW in 2007. Chester also directed the documentary Rock Prophecies, about the rock photographer Robert Knight, which won three audience awards for best documentary feature and was distributed nationally on PBS in 2010. 

His project The Biggest Little Farm is a feature-length film that chronicles the 7-year story of Apricot Lane Farms, the regenerative farm he and his wife Molly started in 2011. The film premiered at the 2018 Telluride Film Festival and Toronto International Film Festival and 2019 Sundance Film Festival, and releases May 2019 in theaters nationwide. In 2018, Chester began a 3-year book deal with publisher Feiwel & Friends/Macmillan for a spin-off children's book series featuring characters from the film, of which the first installment Saving Emma the Pig was scheduled for release in 2019  and listed on Amazon.Com as a Hardcover publication for May 14, 2019.

Filmography 
 2018 The Biggest Little Farm - Director, writer, producer, himself.
 Super Soul Sunday - Director. Shorts
 Rock Prophecies - Director.
 Random 1 - Director.
 Lost in Woonsocket - Director.
 Jockeys  - Director.
 Bait Car - Director.

Awards 
 2018 Emmy Award Special Class – Outstanding Writing "The Orphan"
92nd Oscars Shortlist - Documentary Feature

References

External links
 John Chester
 
 Saving Emma the Pig, (children's book)

Year of birth missing (living people)
Living people
American documentary filmmakers
People from Ocean City, Maryland